In the Employ of the Secret Service is a 1931 German drama film directed by Gustav Ucicky and starring Brigitte Helm, Willy Fritsch, and Oskar Homolka. It concerns espionage between Germany and Russia during the First World War. It was made at the Babelsberg Studios in Berlin with sets designed by the art directors Robert Herlth and Walter Röhrig. Location shooting took place in Denmark.

Cast

References

External links

1930s spy drama films
1931 drama films
German spy drama films
Films of the Weimar Republic
Films directed by Gustav Ucicky
World War I spy films
Films set in Russia
UFA GmbH films
German black-and-white films
1930s German films
Films shot at Babelsberg Studios
1930s German-language films